The 1949 Major League Baseball season was contested from April 18 through October 15, 1949. Both the American League (AL) and National League (NL) had eight teams, with each team playing a 154-game schedule. The New York Yankees won the World Series over the Brooklyn Dodgers in five games. Ted Williams of the Boston Red Sox and Jackie Robinson of the Dodgers won the Most Valuable Player Award in the AL and NL, respectively.

Standings

American League

National League

Postseason

Bracket

Awards and honors

Statistical leaders

All-Star game

Feats

Cycles
Wally Westlake, Pittsburgh Pirates, June 14 vs. Boston Braves
Gil Hodges, Brooklyn Dodgers, June 25 at Pittsburgh Pirates
Stan Musial, St. Louis Cardinals, July 24 at Brooklyn Dodgers

Records

American League

National League

Managers

American League

National League

Home Field Attendance

Notable events

January–March
January 28 – The New York Giants sign their first black players, outfielder Monte Irvin and pitcher Ford Smith, and assign them to a minor league affiliate at Jersey City.  Irvin will eventually go on to have a Hall of Fame career for the Giants, but Smith never reaches the major leagues.
February 7 – Joe DiMaggio signs a $100,000 contract with the New York Yankees.  It is the first six-figure contract in major league history.
March 2 – A slumping Joe DiMaggio leaves spring training in Florida to have his ailing right heel examined at Johns Hopkins Hospital.  DiMaggio is assured that surgery is unnecessary and returns to the Yankees.  The as yet undiagnosed heel ailment will continue to plague DiMaggio throughout the season.

April–May
April 12 – Joe DiMaggio returns to Johns Hopkins Hospital due to continuing pain in his right heel.  The Yankee center fielder is diagnosed with a bone spur, which will cause him to miss 65 games during the season.
April 18 – The regular season gets underway with the Philadelphia Phillies defeating the Boston Braves, 4–0, and the Washington Senators topping the Philadelphia Athletics, 3–2.
April 19 – Prior to opening day at Yankee Stadium, the Yankees dedicate a granite monument to the recently deceased Babe Ruth in center field. Plaques honoring Lou Gehrig and Miller Huggins are also unveiled. Ruth's widow, Mayor William O'Dwyer, and Governor Thomas Dewey are among those in attendance who see the Yankees defeat the Senators, 3–2, on a two-out solo home run from Tommy Henrich in the bottom of the ninth. Gene Woodling plays center field in place of the injured Joe DiMaggio.
April 20 – Willie Jones of the Philadelphia Phillies hits a record-tying four consecutive doubles in a 6–5 loss to the Boston Braves.
April 26 – Brooklyn Dodgers Gene Hermanski, Jackie Robinson, and Gil Hodges combine for a 7–4–3 triple play during a 5–2 win over the visiting Boston Braves.  It is the only triple play in Brooklyn Dodgers history.
May 5 – The Red Sox trade outfielder Stan Spence to the St. Louis Browns for outfielder Al Zarilla.
May 22 – Don Newcombe of the Brooklyn Dodgers makes his first career start in spectacular fashion, shutting out the Cincinnati Reds, 3–0.  Newcombe is the first National League pitcher in 11 years to debut with a shutout.

June–July
June 2 – The Phillies hit five home runs in an inning, tying a major league record set by the Giants in 1939.  The Phillies defeat their opponent this day, the visiting Reds, 12–3.
June 5 – Commissioner Happy Chandler rescinds the ban against players who had participated in the Mexican leagues.
June 12 – Charlie Grimm resigns as manager of the last-place Chicago Cubs and moves to the club's front office as a vice president.  Grimm is replaced by Frankie Frisch.
Gil Hodges hits a grand slam and collects eight RBIss for the Brooklyn Dodgers in their 20–7 win over the Cincinnati Reds.
June 13 – The Giants trade catcher Walker Cooper to the Reds for catcher Ray Mueller.
June 14 – Following the Phillies 4–1 win over the Chicago Cubs at Wrigley Field, first baseman Eddie Waitkus is shot by Ruth Ann Steinhagen, an obsessed fan, at Chicago's Edgewater Beach Hotel. The shooting occurs just before midnight.  The bullet punctures Waitkus' lung and lodges near his heart.  After undergoing four operations, he recovers enough to play the following season, but he is not the same ballplayer.  At the time of the shooting, Waitkus was batting .304 and leading the all-star voting among National League first basemen. Waitkus' shooting serves as the inspiration for the "Roy Hobbs" character in the Bernard Malamud novel, The Natural, and its subsequent film adaptation.
June 24 – The Boston Red Sox pound the St. Louis Browns for 25 hits in a 21–2 win.  Ted Williams contributes seven RBIss to go along with two home runs, three runs scored, and a stolen base.
June 28 – After missing the first 65 games of the season due to a bone spur in his right heel, Joe DiMaggio awakes in early June to find the pain in his heel has disappeared. DiMaggio returns to the Yankee lineup with a home run and a single in a 5–4 win over the Boston Red Sox at Fenway Park. The crowd of 36,228 is the largest for a night game in Fenway history.  With the win, the first-place Yankees move 4½ games ahead of the second-place Philadelphia Athletics and 6 games ahead of the third-place Red Sox.
June 29 – The Yankees come back from a seven-run deficit to defeat the Red Sox, 9–7.  Joe DiMaggio belts two home runs in the win, a three-run shot in the fifth and a tie-breaking two-run blast in the eighth that provides the margin of victory.
June 30 – Joe DiMaggio belts his fourth home run in three games, a three-run shot off the left field light tower at Fenway Park.  DiMaggio's home run powers the Yankees to a 6–3 victory and a three-game sweep of the Red Sox.  The Red Sox drop to fifth-place, 8 games behind the front-running Yankees.
July 2 – Monte Kennedy of the New York Giants shuts out the Brooklyn Dodgers, 16–0. Kennedy contributes a seventh-inning grand slam to his cause. The 16-run margin sets a club record for biggest shutout win that would stand until 2000.
July 4 – At Yankee Stadium, the New York Yankees sweep a doubleheader against the Boston Red Sox, extending Boston's losing streak to eight games. The Yankees take the first game, 3–2, and the rain-shortened second, 6–4.  The sweep leaves the Red Sox 12 games behind the first-place Yankees.
July 6 – Walker Cooper ties a modern record with six hits in seven at-bats, smashing three home runs and collecting 10 RBIss in the Cincinnati Reds' 23–4 pummeling of the Chicago Cubs.
July 8 – Monte Irvin and Hank Thompson, called up three days earlier from Jersey City, become the first blacks to play for the New York Giants. Thompson starts at second base and Irvin pinch hits in the eighth. When Thompson steps in against Brooklyn Dodger Don Newcombe, it is the first time in major league history that a black batter and pitcher have squared off. The Dodgers win the game, 4–3.
A 16-inning affair between the Phillies and Braves ends at 1:01 a.m., becoming, to date, the latest-ending National League game in history. The Braves win the game, 4–3.
July 12 – The American League defeats the National League, 11–7, in the All-Star Game at Ebbets Field.  The NL commits five errors in the game.  The contest is noteworthy for also being the first Midsummer Classic to feature black players: Jackie Robinson, Roy Campanella, and Don Newcombe of the National League, and Larry Doby of the American League.
July 24 – Stan Musial bats for the cycle in the Cardinals' 14–1 rout of the Dodgers. With their third straight win over the Dodgers, the Cardinals erase the lead Brooklyn has held for most of the season and catapult into first place in the National League.
July 26 – Wally Moses of the Philadelphia Athletics collects his 2,000th career hit in a 5–4 win over the St. Louis Browns
July 28 – Jackie Robinson raises his National League-leading batting average to .364 after a 12 for 25 streak.  Robinson's average will drop, but he will win the batting title with a career-high .342 average.

August
August 3 – Boston Red Sox pitcher Ellis Kinder strikes out 14 batters in a 9–3 win over the St. Louis Browns.  It is the most strikeouts by a Sox pitcher since Smoky Joe Wood struck out 15 in 1911.
August 5 – Luke Appling of the Chicago White Sox appears in a major league-record 2,154th game, surpassing Rabbit Maranville's previous mark.  Appling will finish his career with 2,218 games played.
August 6 – Adrian Zabala sets a National League record by balking three times in the Giants' 3–1 win over the St. Louis Cardinals. Despite the loss, the Cardinals remain 1/2 game ahead in the National League by virtue of the second-place Brooklyn Dodgers' loss to the Cincinnati Reds.
August 7 – In the first game of a doubleheader against the Browns, Yankees catcher Yogi Berra suffers a fractured thumb when he is hit by a pitch after hitting a three-run home run in his previous at bat. The injury will keep Berra out of the Yankee lineup until September.  The Yankees win the game, 20–2.
August 8 – Carl Furillo returns to the Dodgers' lineup after an injury and collects two hits and a run scored in Brooklyn's 2–1 win over the rival Giants. The win keeps the Dodgers tied with the Cardinals for first place.  Furillo will hit .431 over the final eight weeks of the season and finish at .322, fourth best in the league.
August 9 – Dom DiMaggio's 34-game hitting streak comes to an end in the Boston Red Sox' 6–3 win over the Yankees at Yankee Stadium. Hitless in his first four at-bats, Dom hits a sinking line drive in the eighth that his brother Joe catches at the shoestrings. The resurgent Red Sox move within 5½ games of the Yankees with the win.
August 15 – With the defending National League-champion Boston Braves struggling at 55–54 and dogged by rumors of clubhouse dissension, manager Billy Southworth takes a leave of absence and is replaced for the rest of the season by Johnny Cooney.
August 17 – The St. Louis Cardinals move back into first place with a 4–3 win over the Cincinnati Reds.
August 21 – The New York Giants receive a forfeit victory over the Philadelphia Phillies when fans at Shibe Park bombard the field with bottles after umpire George Barr rules that Phillie Richie Ashburn trapped a line drive. The forfeiture is the first in the majors since 1942. The Giants were leading 4–2 with one out in the ninth inning when the forfeit was declared.
August 22 – The New York Yankees acquire Johnny Mize from the New York Giants in exchange for $40,000.  At the time, the Yankees' lead over the now second-place Boston Red Sox is down to 2½ games.
The Boston Braves score two runs in the ninth inning to defeat the Brooklyn Dodgers, 7–6. One of the runs comes on Eddie Stanky's first home run of the season. The loss is Brooklyn's sixth in seven games and drops the Dodgers two games behind the Cardinals.
August 26 – With a doubleheader sweep of the White Sox, the Red Sox close to within 1½ games of the Yankees. The Red Sox win the first game, 11–4, behind Mel Parnell, who becomes the majors' first 20-game winner of the season, and Ted Williams, who slams his 31st and 32nd home runs of the season. The Red Sox take the second game, 10–7.
August 28 – In the first game of a doubleheader in Chicago, Tommy Henrich crashes into the wall while chasing a Chuck Kress fly ball and fractures two vertebrae. The injury will sideline Henrich for three weeks. In the second game, the newly acquired Johnny Mize dislocates his shoulder. With the exception of seven pinch-hit appearances, he will miss the rest of the regular season. The Yankees are also playing without Yogi Berra, who fractured his thumb earlier in the month. Despite the injuries, the Yankees sweep the doubleheader by scores of 8–7 and 7–5.

September
September 4 – The Cardinals sweep a doubleheader against the Reds, 6–4 and 11–2, to push their lead over the Dodgers to 2½ games.
September 5 – The Yankees sweep a Labor Day doubleheader at Shibe Park against the Athletics. Joe DiMaggio hits a grand slam and drives in five runs in the Yankees' 13–4 win in the opener. The Yankees take the second game, which was shortened by darkness, 5–2. The Yankees lead over the Red Sox now stands at 1½ games.
September 8 – In an 8–0 win over the Chicago Cubs, Red Schoendienst steals the St. Louis Cardinals' 17th and final base of the season, setting a major league record for fewest steals in a season.
September 9 – At Yankee Stadium, Ellis Kinder wins his 19th game of the season as the Red Sox pound the Yankees, 7–1, cutting the Yankees' lead in the American League to 1½ games.
September 10 – Stan Musial's two-out, two-run home run in the top of the ninth gives the Cardinals a 6–5 win over the Cincinnati Reds, which maintains St. Louis' one-game lead in the National League.
September 11 – The Washington Senators set a major league record for the most base on balls in an inning by surrendering 11 in the third inning during a 20–5 rout at the hands of the New York Yankees.
Stan Musial blasts three home runs as the Cardinals sweep a doubleheader from the Cincinnati Reds, 7–5 and 7–4, to extend their lead over the Dodgers to 1½ games.
September 13 – Ralph Kiner ties a major league record held by six players with his 4th grand slam of the season.  In the Pirates' 11–6 win over the Philadelphia Phillies, Kiner hits 2 home runs and drives in 6 runs.  The 2 home runs come in his first 2 at-bats of the game.  Kiner had homered in his final 2 at-bats in yesterday's game, making it 4 home runs in 4 consecutive at-bats over 2 games.  It is the 2nd time in his career that Kiner has accomplished the feat.
September 14 – Ellis Kinder wins his 20th game of the season, shutting out the Detroit Tigers, 1–0, at Fenway Park.  It is also Kinder's 10th consecutive win.  Kinder joins teammate Mel Parnell as a 20-game winner.  It is the last time this century that the Red Sox will feature a pair of 20-game winners.
September 18 – The injury-plagued Yankees receive another blow when Joe DiMaggio is stricken with pneumonia.  Without DiMaggio, the Yankee still top the Indians, 7–3, at Cleveland Municipal Stadium.  The Red Sox, however, keep pace with an 11–5 rout of the visiting White Sox to remain 2½ games behind the Yanks.  Ted Williams hits his 39th and 40th home runs of the season and drives in 6 runs, giving him 153 RBIss for the season.  Teammate Vern Stephens also hits his 40th home run and drives in his 150th run.
September 19 – The Yankees stretch their lead of the idle Red Sox to 3 games with a 6–0 blanking of the Indians.
Ralph Kiner smacks his 50th home run of the season, but the Pirates fall to the Giants, 6–4, in extra-innings.
September 21 – The Yankees squander an 8–1 lead at Yankee Stadium and fall to the Chicago White Sox, 9–8.  Coupled with the Red Sox' 9–6 victory over the Indians, the Yankees lead shrinks to 2 games.
The Cardinals and Dodgers split a doubleheader at Sportsman's Park, leaving the Cards in front by 1½ games.  The Cards take the first game, 1–0, while the Dodgers answered back with a 5–0 win in the second.
September 22 – The Dodgers amass 19 hits and 13 walks in a 19–6 rout of the host Cardinals, bringing the Bums to within a 1/2 game of first-place.  Carl Furillo has 7 RBIss for Brooklyn.  In a losing effort, Stan Musial hits his 32nd home run of the season—his 21st against lefties, a major league record for a left-handed batter that will later be matched by Ken Griffey Jr. in 1996 and 1998.
September 24 – At Fenway Park, the Red Sox defeat the Yankees, 2–0, to draw within a game of first-place New York. Ted Williams belts his 42nd home run and Ellis Kinder wins his 13th straight game, moving to 4–0 on the season against the Yankees.
Bob Elliott hits 3 straight home runs in the Boston Braves' 6–4 win over the New York Giants at the Polo Grounds. Warren Spahn wins his 20th game, becoming the first National League pitcher this season to do so.  For the decade, Elliot collects a league-best 903 RBIss.
September 25 – A 6–1 by the Cardinals over the Cubs, coupled with the Dodgers' 5–3 loss to the Phillies, gives the Cards a 1½ game lead in the National League.
The Yankees, in first-place all season despite 71 injuries that kept players out of games, fall into a first place tie with the Red Sox after losing to Boston, 4–1, at Fenway Park. Ted Williams hits his 43rd home run of the season, and Mel Parnell allows four hits in winning his 25th game of the season. Joe DiMaggio, still out of the lineup with pneumonia, listens to the game from his hospital bed.
September 26 – Before 67,634 at Yankee Stadium, the Red Sox come away with a 7–6 win and move into sole possession of first place when Johnny Pesky scores on a disputed squeeze play. The Sox rally from a 6–3 deficit by scoring four runs in the eighth. The winning run scores when Bobby Doerr drops a surprise squeeze bunt in front of Tommy Henrich, playing first base, and Pesky slides under the catcher's tag at home plate. Umpire Bill Grieve calls Pesky safe, and Casey Stengel is fined for a post-game confrontation with the ump. Now ahead by one game, the Sox depart for a three-game set in Washington before going back to New York for a final two-game showdown against the Yankees.
September 27 – Vic Raschi wins his 20th game of the season as the Yankees top the A's, 3–1.  The Yankees remain one game back, however, by virtue of the Red Sox' 6–4 win over the Senators.
The Cardinals fall to the Pirates, 6–4, cutting their lead over the idle Dodgers to 1 game.
September 28 – The American League race deadlocked again after the Yankees win a seesaw battle against the A's, 7–5, and the Red Sox fall to the Senators, 2–1, on a wild pitch by Mel Parnell in the bottom of the 9th.  Joe DiMaggio, down 18 pounds from his bout with pneumonia, takes batting practice for the Yankees.
September 29 – The Cardinals fall to the Pirates and former Cardinal Murry Dickson, 7–2.  It is Dickson's 5th win of the season against his former team.  Meanwhile, the Dodgers sweep a doubleheader against the Braves, 9–2 and 8–0, moving them ahead of the Cardinals by a 1/2 game in the National League.
September 30 – The Red Sox move ahead of the Yankees by a game when they defeat the Senators, 11–9, and the Yankees are defeated by Dick Fowler and the A's, 4–1.  Aided by 14 walks, the Sox win the game despite being outhit by the Senators, 18–5.
Ralph Kiner hits his 54th home run of the season and 16th in the month of September as the Pirates defeat the Reds, 3–2.

October
October 1 – Joe DiMaggio returns to the lineup after his weeks-long bout with pneumonia.  The Boston Red Sox, needing to win just 1 of their final 2 games at Yankee Stadium to clinch the pennant, squander a 4–0 lead and fall to the New York Yankees, 5–4.  DiMaggio scores the first run of the game and Johnny Lindell's home run provides the winning margin.  The Yankees and Red Sox find themselves deadlocked atop the American League with a winner-take-all showdown set for the final day of the season.
The Brooklyn Dodgers, now ahead by a game in the National League, lose to the Philadelphia Phillies, 6–4.  The St. Louis Cardinals, however, lose to the Chicago Cubs, 3–1, preserving the Dodgers' 1-game lead.
October 2 – A crowd of 70,000 packs Yankee Stadium to see the Yankees and Red Sox square off on the final day of the season with the American League pennant hanging in the balance.  Phil Rizzuto scores the game's first run after tripling in the 1st.  Vic Raschi nurses the 1–0 lead and duels Ellis Kinder into the 8th inning when the Yankees bust out and plate 4 runs off relievers Mel Parnell and Tex Hughson.  The Red Sox rally for 3 in the 9th, but it's not enough, as the Yankees win the game, 5–3, and the pennant.  Ted Williams is hitless in 2 official at-bats and goes 1 for 12 over the final four games of the season, enabling George Kell of the Tigers to edge Williams for the batting title, .3429 to .3427.
In the National League, Stan Musial's 2 home runs power the Cardinals to a 13–5 win over the Chicago Cubs, momentarily keeping the Redbirds' World Series prospects alive.  Meanwhile, in Philadelphia, the Phillies shell Don Newcombe and tie the Dodgers, 7–7, in the 6th.  The game heads to extra-innings, where the Dodgers plate 2 runs in the top of the 10th to win the game and National League pennant in dramatic fashion.
October 11 – The World Series gets underway at Yankee Stadium.  The New York Yankees and Allie Reynolds beat the Brooklyn Dodgers, 1–0, on Tommy Henrich's home run in the bottom of the 9th off Don Newcombe.  Newcombe had struck out 11 and walked none before Henrich's blast.  Henrich's shot is the first game-ending home run in World Series history.
October 12 – The Dodgers even the Series at 1–1 with a 1–0 win behind Preacher Roe.  Gil Hodges' single in the 2nd drives in Jackie Robinson for the game's only run.
October 13 – With both the Series and game deadlocked at 1–1, the Yankees score 3 runs in the top of the 9th inning at Ebbets Field.  The Dodgers answer with 2 runs in the bottom of the frame, but the Yankees hold on to win, 4–3, and take a 2–1 lead in the Series.
October 15 – The Yankees down the Dodgers 10–6 at Ebbets Field to win the World Series in 5 games.  It is the franchise's 12th World Series title.  Pinch hitter Bobby Brown drives in 5 runs for the Yankees.  Joe Page wins the Babe Ruth Award for the Series.

Movies
It Happens Every Spring

The Stratton Story

Deaths
Tiny Bonham, pitcher for the Pittsburgh Pirates, died September 15 following an appendectomy, just 18 days after his final pitching performance, an 8–2 win over the Philadelphia Phillies.

See also
1949 All-American Girls Professional Baseball League season
1949 Nippon Professional Baseball season

References

External links
1949 Major League Baseball season schedule at Baseball Reference

 
Major League Baseball seasons